Gary Shaw may refer to:
 Gary Shaw (footballer, born 1961), English football striker for Aston Villa
 Gary Shaw (Australian footballer) (born 1959), Australian rules footballer for Collingwood and the Brisbane Bears
 Gary Shaw (Irish footballer) (born 1992), Irish footballer for Bray Wanderers